Rhiannon Davies is a British activist who has worked with her husband, Richard Stanton, to establish the truth about the death of their daughter, Kate-Stanton Davies, at Shrewsbury and Telford Hospital NHS Trust in 2009. The efforts of Davies led to the establishment of the Ockenden Review of maternity services, led by Donna Ockenden.  Further, her campaigning led to West Mercia Police instigating Operation Lincoln into both individual and corporate gross negligence manslaughter at Shrewsbury and Telford Hospital NHS Trust.

Death of Kate Stanton-Davies

In March 2009 Rhiannon Davies gave birth to a daughter, Kate Stanton-Davies, at a midwife-led maternity unit in Ludlow. In the two weeks before the birth Davies had complained that the baby was not moving as much as previously, and had herself been hospitalized after feeling unwell. However, midwives had not carried out any risk assessment or adjusted her birth plan. Kate was born cold and floppy, with hyperthermia and anaemia. A midwife placed Kate in an unheated cot in a side room, and only called an ambulance when a health care assistant found Kate in cardiac arrest.

Kate died after being transferred to a Birmingham hospital. Though Kate was cremated, the Emstrey crematorium did not use settings appropriate for infants. So Rhiannon and her husband Richard Stanton were told there were no ashes.

Pursuit of the truth

Rhiannon Davies and her husband Richard Stanton made formal complaints to the trust, the West Midlands Ambulance Service and the Nursing and Midwifery Council. Initially refused an inquest, they managed to secure one in 2012. The inquest jury unanimously found that Kate's delivery at a midwife-led unit contributed to her avoidable death. They then secured the Health Service Ombudsman's attention to the case after Shrewsbury and Telford Hospital NHS Trust refused to accept the findings of the inquest. The Ombudsman upheld the family's complaint, concluding that Kate's death had been avoidable, and that the Trust was responsible for both service failure in Kate's care and maladministration in handling the complaint. In 2015, after a Shropshire Council inquiry reported into Emstrey crematorium's treatment of infant remains, the council also issued an apology to Davies and the parents of over fifty infants. Davies criticised the report for ignoring concerns which crematorium staff had raised, and for misrepresenting the problem as an historic problem.

After the original NHS England investigation into Kate's death was found "not fit for purpose", a second one reported in February 2016. The report found a range of "system issues", with changes even made to Kate's clinical observation notes after her death. Later that year, an independent review concluded that the trust had not met its responsibility to establish the facts about why Kate's death had occurred. It concluded that the trust was "indebted" to the tenacity of Ms Davies and Mr Stanton, and needed to work in partnership with them "to establish a fitting acknowledgement of the contribution they have made to the safety and quality of maternity services at SaTH".

References

1970s births
Living people
English health activists
English women activists
Parenting